Eretmograptis coniodoxa is a moth in the family Elachistidae, and the only species in the genus Eretmograptis. It was described by Edward Meyrick in 1938. It is found in the Democratic Republic of Congo  (North Kivu).

References

Moths described in 1938
Elachistidae
Moths of Africa
Endemic fauna of the Democratic Republic of the Congo